Do Chahi (also Romanized as Do Chāhī) is a village in Kuh Hamayi Rural District, Rud Ab District, Sabzevar County, Razavi Khorasan Province, Iran. At the 2006 census, its population was 99, in 26 families.

References 

Populated places in Sabzevar County